Stella Dadzie (born in 1952, London) is a British educationalist, activist, writer and historian. She is best known for her involvement in the UK's Black Women's Movement, being a founding member of the Organisation of Women of African and Asian Descent (OWAAD) in the 1970s and co-authoring The Heart of the Race: Black Women's Lives in Britain with Suzanne Scafe and Beverley Bryan. In 2020, Verso published a new book by Dadzie, A Kick in the Belly: Women, Slavery & Resistance.

Early life
Dadzie was born in London to a white English mother and Ghanaian father, who was the first trained pilot in Ghana and after joining the RAF he flew as a navigator in missions over Belgium during the Second World War. Dadzie was in foster care in Wales for about 18 months, before being returned to her mother at the age of four. Interviewed in 2020, Dadzie said: "We experienced poverty, homelessness and racism – my mother was ostracised as she had a black child and was a single parent. We moved around London a huge amount, as we were constantly getting thrown out by racist landlords. There was a lot of pain and suffering." Dadzie did not meet her father and siblings again until she was 12.

Activism and work 
As a student in the early 1970s, Dadzie spent a year studying in Germany, where she experienced "very in-your-face racism". On returning to Britain, she worked with the publication African Red Family and British journal The Black Liberator, selling copies outside Brixton tube station. However, she found them too theoretical. In her twenties, she attended protests in London and Greenham Common.

She was a founder member of the Organisation of Women of African and Asian Descent (OWAAD), active between 1978 and 1982, an umbrella group that challenged white domination of the women's liberation movement of the time. Before co-founding OWAAD, Dadzie was already a part of the Tottenham-based United Black Women's Action Group (UBWAG), where she met Martha Osamor. She had also met Gail Lewis and Gerlin Bean, members of the Brixton Black Women's Group (BBWG). These activists, along with other members of Black women's groups in Britain such as Olive Morris, worked together under OWAAD.

In 1985, The Heart of the Race: Black Women's Lives in Britain was published by Virago Press, having been commissioned by the publisher five years earlier in 1980. The authors, Dadzie, Beverley Bryan and Suzanne Scafe, relied on interviews, weaving together stories to address the experiences of Black women in Britain and the development of the UK's Black Women's Movement. The Heart of the Race won the 1985 Martin Luther King Award for Literature. The book was reissued by Verso (with a new foreword by the Guardian columnist Lola Okolosie) in 2018. In a final chapter added to the new edition, Dadzie states: "In these crucial times we need to remember who we are, remember what we've come from, remember what we've achieved, and never let that be forgotten, because it gives us power, strength and vision. This is what feeds the enthusiasm and the energies of the next generation."

Dadzie has written widely on curriculum development and good practice with black adult learners, and the development of anti-racist strategies with schools, colleges and youth services. Her poetry has been published in Tempa Tupu! Africana Women's Poetic Self-Portrait (Africa World Press, 2008), and in the 2019 anthology New Daughters of Africa (edited by Margaret Busby).

In 2020, Verso published a new book by Dadzie, A Kick in the Belly: Women, Slavery & Resistance, which explores how enslaved women "kicked back" against slavery. Pluto's 2021 edition of Black People in the British Empire by Peter Fryer carries a foreword by Dadzie, as does the book Hairvolution: Her Hair, Her Story, Our History, by Saskia Calliste and Zainab Raghdo (Supernova Books, 2021).

Dadzie's papers are held at the Black Cultural Archives, where they are among the most visited collections.

Selected works
 The Heart of the Race: Black Women's Lives in Britain, with Beverley Bryan, Suzanne Scafe; Virago, 1985, . New edition, London: Verso Books, 2018, 
 Essential Skills for Race Equality Trainers, with Andy Forbes, Gurnam Heire; National Institute of Adult Continuing Education, 1992, 
Older and Wiser: A Study of Educational Provision for Black and Ethnic Minority Elders, National Institute of Adult Continuing Education, 1993, 
 Blood, Sweat and Tears: A Report of the Bede Anti-Racist Detached Youth Work Project, National Youth Agency, 1997, 
 Toolkit for Tackling Racism in Schools Trentham, 2000, 
 A Kick in the Belly: Women, Slavery and Resistance, Verso, 2020,

References

External links
 Stella Dadzie's papers at Black Cultural Archives
 Stella Dadzie interviews as part of the Sisterhood and After: the Women's Liberation Oral History Project at British Library
 "Stella Dadzie: on Black women’s narratives and decolonizing British history"
 "Stella Dadzie in conversation with Lola Olufemi", Feminist Library, London.
 "Hidden Narratives Session 2: Black Women & Activism with Stella Dadzie", via YouTube.

1952 births
20th-century British women writers
21st-century British women writers
21st-century English writers
Black British activists
Black British women writers
British women activists
English educational theorists
English people of Ghanaian descent
Living people
Women educational theorists
Writers from London